Pablo Ferguson (born 5 September 1981) is an Argentine cricketer. He played in the 2013 ICC World Cricket League Division Six tournament.

References

External links
 

1981 births
Living people
Argentine cricketers
Cricketers from Buenos Aires